In United States agricultural policy, Highly erodible land (HEL) refers to land that is very susceptible to erosion, including fields that have at least 1/3 or  of soils with a natural erosion potential of at least 8 times their T value.  About  of cropland meet this definition of HEL, according to the 1997 National Resources Inventory.  Farms cropping highly erodible land and under production flexibility contracts must be in compliance with a conservation plan that protects this cropland.

See also
Tillage erosion

References

Erosion
United States Department of Agriculture